Orocrambus flexuosellus is a species of moth in the family Crambidae. It was first described by Edward Doubleday in 1843. O. flexuosellus is endemic to New Zealand. It has been recorded from the North Island, South Island and the Stewart Islands. The species' habitat consists of lowland to alpine grasslands.

The wingspan is 19–26 mm. Adults have been recorded on wing from November to February.

The larvae are polyphagous, feeding on various grasses and sedges. The adult moths have been shown to pollinate Cassinia fulvida, Dracophyllum acerosum, Hoheria lyallii and Olearia virgata.

References

Moths described in 1843
Crambinae
Moths of New Zealand
Endemic fauna of New Zealand
Taxa named by Henry Doubleday
Endemic moths of New Zealand